A welcome is a kind of greeting.

Welcome may also refer to

Geography
 Welcome metro station, Delhi Metro station
 Welcome Islands, a small rocky archipelago to the north of the main island of South Georgia
 Welcome, Ontario, Canada

United States
 Welcome, Pope County, Arkansas
 Welcome, Florida
 Welcome, Georgia
 Welcome, Kentucky
 Welcome, Maryland
 Welcome, Minnesota
 Welcome, Nevada
 Welcome, Louisiana
 Welcome, St. John the Baptist Parish, Louisiana
 Welcome, North Carolina
 Welcome, South Carolina
 Welcome, Texas
 Welcome, Virginia
 Welcome, Washington
 Welcome, Wisconsin, a historical name for Bear Creek, Outagamie County, Wisconsin
 Welcome Creek, in Welcome Creek Wilderness, Montana

People
 Welcome (name), including a list of people with the name

Film and TV
 Welcome (1986 film), a Soviet paint-on-glass-animated short film adapted from Thidwick the Big-Hearted Moose
 Welcome (2007 film), Hindi film directed by Anees Bazmee
 Welcome (2009 film), 2009 French film by Philippe Lioret
 Welcome (TV series), 2020 South Korean television series

Music

Albums
 Welcome (Santana album), a 1973 album
 Welcome (SBB album), a 1979 album 
 Welcome (Taproot album), the second studio album by Taproot
 Welcome (Doyle Bramhall II album)
 Welcome (Patrick Nuo album), a 2003 album
 Welcome (EP), a 2011 EP by Idles
 Welcome, a 2021 EP by Daði Freyr

Songs
 "Welcome" (Erick Sermon song), a 1995 song
 "Welcome" (Fort Minor song), a 2015 song
 "Welcome" (Martin Garrix song), a 2016 song
 "Welcome", a song by American nu metal band Slipknot
 "Welcome", a song by The Who
 "Welcome", song by Marta Sánchez 2015, No.1 in Mexico

Other
Welcome Nugget, the name given to a 69 kg gold nugget discovered at Bakery Hill in Ballarat, Victoria
Welcome sign, a road sign at the border of a region that introduces or welcomes visitors
Welcome Stadium, a multi-purpose stadium in Dayton, Ohio
, a United States Navy patrol boat commissioned in 1917 and stricken in 1919
, a Point-class cutter of the United States Coast Guard
Club Atlético Welcome, a basketball club in Montevideo, member of the Uruguayan Basketball Federation.

Wellcome
 Wellcome, a Hong Kong supermarket chain under DFI Retail Group
 Wellcome, a pharmaceuticals company, that later merged with Glaxo and others to form GlaxoSmithKline
 Wellcome Trust, a UK medical charity
 Henry Wellcome (1853–1936), pharmaceutical entrepreneur
 Wellcome Collection, a museum and library in London

See also
 Welcome Home (disambiguation)
 Wellcom, a cell-phone operator of Thailand
 Welkom, a city in South Africa
 velcom, a cell-phone operator of Belarus